Héctor Vidal Martínez (born 15 June 1967) is a retired football midfielder from Paraguay. He played professional football in his native country Paraguay. His last club was Club Sportivo San Lorenzo.

International 
Vidal made his international debut for the Paraguay national football team on 27 February 1991 in a friendly match against Brazil (1-1), substituting Jorge Guasch in the 85th minute. He obtained three international caps, scoring no goals for the national side.

1967 births
Living people
Paraguayan footballers
Paraguay international footballers
Association football midfielders
1991 Copa América players
Place of birth missing (living people)